The 1999 IBF World Championships (World Badminton Championships) were held in Copenhagen, Denmark, between 10 May and 23 May 1999. Following the results of the women's doubles.

Qualification

First round
 Sara Jónsdóttir / Ólöf Ólafsdóttir -  Lubna Abdel Razzak / Huda Said: w.o. 
 Malin Virta / Marjaana Moilanen -  Krisztina Ádám / Csilla Fórián: 15:7, 17:14
 Elma Ong / Moira Ong -  Lily Chen / Yeping Tang: w.o. 
 Linda Montignies / Monique Ric-Hansen -  Olga Gafarova / Irina Gritsenko: w.o.

Second round
 Sara Jónsdóttir / Ólöf Ólafsdóttir -  Olamide Toyin Adebayo / Prisca Azuine
 Malin Virta / Marjaana Moilanen -  Megan Chungu / Charity Mwape
 Archana Deodhar / Manjusha Kanwar -  Elma Ong / Moira Ong
 Linda Montignies / Monique Ric-Hansen -  Gloria Emina / Kuburat Mumini
 Tatiana Gerassimovitch / Vlada Tcherniavskaia -  Lorena Bugallo Castro / Alice Garay
 Erla Björg Hafsteinsdóttir / Drífa Harðardóttir -  Helene Abusdal / Monica Halvorsen
 Svetlana Alferova / Marina Yakusheva -  Neelima K. Choudhary / P. V. V. Lakshmi
 Piret Hamer / Kairi Saks -  Maria Kizil / Nadieżda Kostiuczyk

Main stage

Section 1

Section 2

Section 3

Section 4

Final stage

External links 
 http://www.tournamentsoftware.com/sport/events.aspx?id=0C8BEFBC-C502-47FB-8C0B-A57F034F3452
 http://www.worldbadminton.com/results/19990518_WorldChampionships/results.htm

1999 IBF World Championships
IBF